WXBW (Big Buck Country 101.5) is an FM radio station located in Gallipolis, Ohio. The station has an additional booster station, WXBW-FM1 located in Huntington, West Virginia. The stations are licensed to Fifth Avenue Broadcasting Company, Inc. Previously a classic rock radio station, then-owner Connoisseur Media flipped 101.5 The River (WRYV) to Variety Hits as 101.5 Bob FM at approximately 10:00 p.m. on August 26, 2008. At this time, the station became known as WXBW. This became the 4th market in which Connoisseur is using the Bob FM presentation. On March 28, 2011, 101.5 flipped again, this time to classic country as Big Buck Country 101.5. The Big Buck Country branding has also been on the now-WRXS in Milwaukee, Wisconsin.

External links

XBW
Gallia County, Ohio